is an arcade shooter game developed by Sanritsu Denki and released by Sega in 1984. Bally-Midway manufactured the game in the US. The player assumes the part of an Old West sheriff who must protect a bank and its customers from masked robbers.

Gameplay

Controls consist of a two-position joystick and three buttons to fire at the left, center, and right positions.

The layout of the bank is implicitly a circle with twelve numbered doors and the player in the center. The player can rotate to the left or right using the joystick, viewing three doors at a time, and shoot at a door by pressing the button corresponding to its position on the screen. The doors will open to reveal one of the following:

 A customer, who will make a deposit by dropping a bag of money onto the counter
 A robber, who will attempt to shoot the player
 A young boy wearing a stack of hats, which the player can rapidly shoot to gain a deposit or bonus time

The level ends once every door has received at least one deposit. If a customer makes a deposit at a door where a bank teller is sitting, the player earns bonus points.

The status of each door is indicated by a row of numbered boxes across the top of the screen, with a red dollar sign representing a door with a completed deposit. A bar gauge above each box shows how close a person is to reaching that door. The disappearance of a dollar sign indicates that a robber has just stolen a deposit; the player must then turn to that door and shoot the robber to recover it.

At random intervals, a bomb will be placed on one of the doors and a rapid timer will count down from 99. The player must move to that door and destroy the bomb with gunfire. Shooting a customer, being shot by a robber, failing to destroy a bomb, or failing to complete the level before the overall timer runs out (shown by a bar at the bottom of the screen) costs the player one life.

Some robbers will wear white boots; these robbers need to be shot twice to be eliminated. At times, a robber may push a customer aside or duck out of view to avoid the player's gunfire, or a door may open to reveal a customer tied up with rope. In the latter case, the player has a short time to fire one shot and free the customer, who will then make three deposits instead of one; if the player waits too long, a robber pushes the customer aside.

Shortly after a robber appears in a doorway, a timer appears above his head and begins to count quickly up to 0:30 and back down to 0:00, leading to a "FAIR" kill if he is shot during this period. Higher point values are awarded for shooting when the timer is closer to 0:00, but any shot fired before the timer appears leads to an "UNFAIR" kill and a minimum value. At the end of a level, the player earns bonus points for all deposits made and any remaining time, and a further bonus based on the average time of all FAIR kills made during the level.

Each time the player shoots a red-shirted robber when the timer displays 0:00, one letter in the word EXTRA is awarded, shown at the bottom of the screen. Completing the word awards a large bonus and an extra life and immediately advances the player to the next level.

Reception 
In Japan, Game Machine listed Bank Panic on their November 1, 1984 issue as being the second most-successful table arcade unit of the month.

Computer and Video Games magazine gave the arcade game a positive review, calling it a well-designed game. They later noted the game is similar to Nintendo's Hogan's Alley, which released the same year. Computer Gamer magazine stated that the "Colourful and  graphics make this an enjoyable, if simple in concept, game."

Legacy
West Bank is a clone from Dinamic Software for the ZX Spectrum, Commodore 64, MSX, and Amstrad CPC. An Atari 8-bit family clone was released in 1992 as Bang! Bank!

References

External links

1984 video games
Arcade video games
Video games set in the United States
Western (genre) video games
Midway video games
MSX games
Sega video games
Master System games
SG-1000 games
Sega arcade games
Sanritsu Denki games
Video games about police officers
Video games developed in Japan